Rotaru is a Romanian surname meaning "wheelwright". Notable people with the surname include:
 
Alina Rotaru (born 1993), Romanian long jumper
Doina Rotaru (born 1951), Romanian composer
Elysia Rotaru (born 1984), Canadian actress
Gabriel Rotaru (born 1971), Romanian footballer
Ioana Rotaru (born 1984), Romanian rower
Nicolae Rotaru (born 1935), Romanian sport shooter
Sofia Rotaru (born 1947), Soviet Ukrainian singer of Moldovan descent

See also 
 Rotar (disambiguation)

Romanian-language surnames
Occupational surnames